Tha Streetz Iz a Mutha is the second studio album by the American rapper Kurupt. It was released in 1999 through Antra Records with distribution from Artemis Records.

The album contains the single "Who Ride Wit Us". The track "Callin' Out Names" is a diss track directed toward rappers Foxy Brown and DMX.

Critical reception
Vibe thought that Kurupt "destroys ... lesser lyricists ... while dipping and sliding around G-funk beats."

AllMusic wrote: "Unspectacular but solid, this was part of a late-1999 West Coast revival."

Track listing 
Track listing and credits adapted from liner notes.

Notes
 signifies a co-producer.
 signifies an additional producer.
"Who Ride wit Us" features additional vocals by Bad Azz, Blaqthoven and Dimen.
"Tequilla" features backing vocals by Nivea.
"It Ain't About You" features additional vocals by Latoya Williams.
"Step Up" features scratches by DJ Battlecat.

Sample credits
"Loose Cannons" contains samples of "Eazy-er Said Than Dunn" as performed by Eazy-E and "Quiet On tha Set" as performed by N.W.A.
"Represent Dat G.C." contains samples of "Kool Whip" as performed by the Fatback Band.
"Trylogy" contains samples of "Violin Concerto Movement III" as performed by Johannes Brahms.
"Tha Streetz Iz a Mutha" contains samples of "Ike's Mood I" as performed by Isaac Hayes.
"It Ain't About You" contains samples of "Surface (song)" as performed by Surface.
"Girls All Pause" contains samples of "Gangster Boogie" as performed by Chicago Gangsters and "The Men All Pause" as performed by Klymaxx.
"Step Up" contains samples of "Top Billin'" as performed by Audio Two.
"Calling Out Names" contains samples of "Nuthin' but a 'G' Thang" as performed by Dr. Dre and "3 Card Molly" by Xzibit

Chart performance

References

Streetz Iz A Mutha, The
Streetz Iz A Mutha, The
Artemis Records albums
Albums produced by Bink (record producer)
Albums produced by Daz Dillinger
Albums produced by Fredwreck
Albums produced by Organized Noize
Albums produced by Soopafly